Anthony "Tony" Finigan was a British theatre, television, radio and film actor, and stage and TV director. He began his career in 1948 as an assistant stage manager.

Born c. 1926 in Islington, North London, he was educated at Merchant Taylors' School, Northwood.

Film roles included Oliver Twist (1997) and Colin Bateman's Cycle of Violence and Divorcing Jack (both 1998). His final role was in Richard Attenborough's Closing the Ring (2008).

Family
His wife since 1952, Primrose "Prim" Finigan, died in 2004. Suffering from progressive dementia, he died on 6 March 2009, aged 83. He was survived by three daughters and six grandchildren.

External links
 Obituary

1920s births
2009 deaths
English male film actors
English male radio actors
English male stage actors
English male television actors
British television directors
People educated at Merchant Taylors' School, Northwood
People from Islington (district)